On the Kocher Viaduct near Schwäbisch Hall in Germany the Autobahn 6 crosses the Kocher valley between Heilbronn and Nuremberg. With its maximum height of 185m above the valley bottom, it is the highest viaduct in Germany, and was also the bridge with the tallest pillars in the world before the Millau Viaduct, France was completed in 2004.

The nine spans of this prestressed concrete girder bridge cover a length of 1128m, the individual span lengths being 81m for the outer two and 138m for the remaining seven. Pillar height varies from 40m to 178m. The bridge table is 31m wide. Construction was from 1976 to 1979.

A museum in the village of Geislingen am Kocher below the bridge (visits by prior appointment) not only tells the bridge's story but also displays dinosaur fossils found during the construction of the motorway.

See also
 List of bridges in Germany
List of highest bridges
List of tallest bridges

References

A. Linse: Kochertalbrücke-Entwürfe einer Großbrücke. In: Bauingenieur, Jahrgang 1978, S. 453–463.
Höchste deutsche Talbrücke: Kochertalbrücke

Buildings and structures in Baden-Württemberg
Bridges completed in 1979
Road bridges in Germany
Viaducts in Germany